Bele Bele en la Habana is an album by the Cuban pianist Chucho Valdés, released in 1998. Valdés supported the album with a North American tour.

The album peaked at No. 22 on Billboard'''s Jazz Albums chart. It was nominated for a Grammy Award, in the "Best Latin Jazz Performance" category.

Production
The album was produced by Réne López. It was recorded in Toronto, with Valdés leading a trio. "Con Poco Coco" was written by Bebo Valdés, Chucho's father. "Los Caminos" was written by Pablo Milanés. "Lorraine" is dedicated to the owner of the Village Vanguard. "But Not For Me" is a cover of the Gershwin song. "Son Montuno" was written by Valdés in the 1960s. 

Critical receptionThe Philadelphia Inquirer noted that several pieces "contain references to the suitelike Cuban danzon and the agitated high-speed-chase lines associated with Dizzy Gillespie's bebop-era Afro-Cuban hybrid." The Los Angeles Times stated that "the music ranges from a son to a mambo, from a danzon to a guaguanco."

The Hartford Courant thought that Valdés's piano "sounds like a giant modern orchestra powered by a dynamo percussion section." The Globe and Mail'' opined that Valdés's "playing is impressive enough in its power and technical facility, but his showy improvisations have an off-handed glibness that leaves them less than compelling and sometimes even less than fully coherent."

AllMusic wrote that "Valdés more often than not is all over the keyboard, comfortable with everything from Ravel-ian classical complexity to Bill Evans' introspection to Cecil Taylor-like crunches."

Track listing

References

Chucho Valdés albums
1998 albums
Blue Note Records albums